Actinobacillus suis is a beta-haemolytic, Gram-negative bacterium of the family Pasteurellaceae. The bacterium has many strains and is the pathogen responsible for actinobacillosis in pigs of all ages. It can also infect wild birds, domestic ruminants, dogs, cats, and horses. The organism can be found in the respiratory tract and tonsils of both infected and healthy pigs that act as carriers. Transmission is via the respiratory tract and piglets are usually infected early on in life. Herds with a high health status are more at risk and outbreaks can be explosive.

Clinical signs and diagnosis
Affected piglets can develop septicaemia, multifocal infections, and respiratory signs, and may die. Adult pigs may show signs relating to pneumonia, lethargy, anorexia, skin lesions similar to erysipelas, and sudden death. Diagnosis relies on the culture of sampled tissues to isolate the organism. Signs and necropsy findings may mimic diseases such as erysipelas, Glasser's disease, and Streptococcus suis or Actinobacillus pleuropneumoniae infection.

Treatment and control
Antibiotics such as ceftiofur, gentamicin, and trimethoprim/sulfadiazine are effective in treating the disease if diagnosis is rapid enough. Biosecurity measures should be strictly followed in herds, including adequate quarantine time, testing, and disinfection protocols.

References
Actinobacillus suis, reviewed and published by Wikivet at http://en.wikivet.net/Actinobacillus_suis accessed 07/10/2011.
Actinobacillosis - Pig, reviewed and published by Wikivet at http://en.wikivet.net/Actinobacillosis_-_Pig accessed 07/10/2011.

External links
Type strain of Actinobacillus suis at BacDive -  the Bacterial Diversity Metadatabase

Swine diseases
Bacteria described in 1910
Pasteurellales